Dumitru Panaitescu (born May 1, 1913, date of death unknown) is a Romanian boxer who competed in the 1936 Summer Olympics. In 1936 he was eliminated in the first round of the flyweight class after losing his fight to Felipe Nunag.

External links
Dumitru Panaitescu's profile at Sports Reference.com
Dumitru Panaitescu's profile at Boxrec.com

1913 births
Year of death missing
Flyweight boxers
Olympic boxers of Romania
Boxers at the 1936 Summer Olympics
Romanian male boxers